Jacob Howard Hannemann (born April 29, 1991) is an American former professional baseball outfielder. He previously played for the Seattle Mariners. Prior to his professional career, he attended Brigham Young University (BYU) and played college baseball for the BYU Cougars.

Amateur career
Hannemann attended Lone Peak High School in Highland, Utah, graduating in 2010. The Kansas City Royals selected Hannemann in the 48th round of the 2010 MLB Draft. Though the Royals offered Hannemann a $250,000 signing bonus, Hannemann opted not to sign.

While a student at Lone Peak, Hannemann was offered a scholarship to attend Brigham Young University (BYU) to play college baseball and college football for the BYU Cougars. He agreed to attend BYU, but postponed his enrollment by two years so that he could complete a two-year mission for the Church of Jesus Christ of Latter-day Saints in Little Rock, Arkansas. Hanneman enrolled in BYU in 2012, but injured his hip flexor, knees, and wrist, and had to take a redshirt for the 2012 season. Playing for the school's baseball team in the 2013 season, Hannemann had a .344 batting average with five home runs, 29 runs batted in, 14 stolen bases in 15 attempts, a .415 on-base percentage, and a .553 slugging percentage. He was named the West Coast Conference Freshman of the Year and a Freshman All-American by Louisville Slugger.

Professional career

Chicago Cubs
The Chicago Cubs selected Hannemann in the third round of the 2013 MLB draft, and offered him a $1 million signing bonus. Hannemann signed with the Cubs, and made his professional debut, but he appeared in only 17 games for the Arizona Cubs of the Rookie-level Arizona League and the Boise Hawks of the Class A-Short Season Northwest League before injuries ended his season. In 2014, he began the season with the Kane County Cougars of the Class A Midwest League and was promoted to the Daytona Cubs of the Class A-Advanced Florida State League. After the season, the Cubs assigned Hannemann to the Arizona Fall League, where he batted .279 in 17 games.

Hannemann began the 2015 season with the Myrtle Beach Pelicans of the Class-A Advanced Carolina League, and was promoted to the Tennessee Smokies of the Class AA Southern League in April. Hannemann ended 2015 with a .244 batting average, along with 26 stolen bases. Hannemann returned to the Smokies in 2016, where he batted .247 with 10 home runs and 30 RBI's. The Cubs added him to their 40-man roster after the season. He began the 2017 season with Tennessee, and was promoted to the Iowa Cubs of the Class AAA Pacific Coast League.

Seattle Mariners
On September 4, 2017, the Seattle Mariners claimed Hannemann off waivers. The Mariners promoted him to the major leagues the next day. He made his first major league start on September 25 in center field against the Oakland Athletics, going 0-4. He hit his first major league home run on September 30, 2017, off of Ricky Nolasco.

Second stint with Cubs
He was waived by the Mariners following the season and then re-claimed by Chicago on October 26, 2017. He spent all of the 2018 season with AAA Iowa.  He was assigned to AAA Iowa Cubs to start the 2019 season. Hannemann was released by the Cubs organization on July 5, 2019.

Personal life
Hannemann was born in Kahuku, Hawaii. His family moved to Utah when Jacob was eight years old. He is a cousin of Mufi Hannemann, the former mayor of Honolulu.

Hannemann is an Eagle Scout. During his mission in Little Rock, he worked with people addicted to alcohol and cigarettes. Hannemann's younger brother, Micah Hannemann, also played football for BYU.

References

External links

1991 births
Living people
People from Highland, Utah
Baseball players from Utah
Major League Baseball outfielders
Seattle Mariners players
BYU Cougars baseball players
Arizona League Cubs players
Boise Hawks players
Kane County Cougars players
Daytona Cubs players
American Mormon missionaries in the United States
People from Honolulu County, Hawaii
Mesa Solar Sox players
Myrtle Beach Pelicans players
Tennessee Smokies players
Iowa Cubs players
Latter Day Saints from Utah
Latter Day Saints from Hawaii